1234 is the fourth solo album by English musician Ronnie Wood, released in September 1981. In the United States, it spent five weeks on the Billboard 200, peaking at number 164. The album was co-produced by Andy Johns and features musical contributions from Ian McLagan, Charlie Watts, Bobby Womack, Waddy Wachtel and Nicky Hopkins, among others.

Track listing 
 "1234" (Ronnie Wood)
 "Fountain of Love" (Wood, Jim Ford)
 "Outlaws" (Wood, Ford)
 "Redeyes" (Wood; inspired by Mick Jagger)
 "Wind Howlin' Through" (Wood)
 "Priceless" (Wood, Bobby Womack; arranged by Mr. Rod Stewart)
 "She Was Out There" (Wood)
 "Down to the Ground" (Wood)
 "She Never Told Me" (Wood, Ford)

Personnel 
Ronnie Wood – vocals, guitar (2,3,4,6,7,9), bass (1,4,9, dobro (4), piano (7), keyboards (9)
Bobby Womack – 12-string guitar (2), bass (2)
Waddy Wachtel – acoustic guitar (9)
Robin Le Mesurier – guitar (6)
Jimmy Haslip – bass (8,9)
Jay Davis – bass (6)
Carmine Appice – drums (6)
Jim Keltner – percussion (1,7,9)
Charlie Watts – drums (4,7,9)
Alan Myers – drums (5)
Ian Wallace – drums (2,3,8)
Alvin Taylor – drums (1)
Ian McLagan – electric piano (2, organ (3,7,8), keyboards (9)
Nicky Hopkins – piano (3,4,6), keyboards (9)
Bobby Keys – saxophone (1)
Jim Horn – saxophone (1)
Steve Madaio - saxophone (1)
Anita Pointer – backing vocals (3,9)
Clydie King – backing vocals (2,6)
Sherlie Matthews – backing vocals (2)
Jimmy Z – harmonica
Technical
Karat Faye - second engineer
Ronnie Wood - artwork, drawings

References

Ronnie Wood albums
1981 albums
Albums produced by Andy Johns
Columbia Records albums